India has a parliamentary system as defined by its constitution, with power distributed between the central government and the states.

The President of India is the ceremonial head of state of the country and supreme commander-in-chief for all defence forces in India.

However, it is the Prime Minister of India, who is the leader of the party or political alliance having a majority in the national elections to the Lok Sabha. The Prime Minister is the leader of the executive branch of the Government of India. The Prime Minister is the chief adviser to the President of India and the head of the Union Council of Ministers.

India is regionally divided into States (and Union Territories) and each State has a Governor who is the state's head, but the executive authority rests with the Chief Minister who is the leader of the party or political alliance that has won a majority in the regional elections otherwise known as State Assembly Elections that exercises executive powers in that State. The respective State's Chief Minister has executive powers within the State and works jointly with the Prime Minister of India or their ministers on matters that require both State and Central attention. Some Union Territories also elect an Assembly and have a territorial government and other (mainly smaller) Union Territories are governed by a person appointed by the President of India.

The President of India monitors the rule of law through their appointed governors in each State and on their recommendation can take over the executive powers from the Chief Minister of the State, temporarily when the elected representatives of the State government has failed to create a peaceful environment and has deteriorated into chaos. The President of India dissolves the existing State government if necessary, and a new election is conducted.

Elections
Election Commission is the federal body of India which is enacted under the provisions of the Constitution, responsible for monitoring and administering all the electoral processes of India. This body is responsible for ensuring elections are free and fair, without any bias.

Election  ensures the conduct of members pre-elections, during elections, and post-elections are as per the statutory legislation.

All election-related disputes are handled by the Election Commission. The Supreme Court of India has held that where the enacted laws are silent or make insufficient provisions to deal with a given situation in the conduct of elections, the Election Commission has the residuary powers under the Constitution to act as appropriate.The first election Commissioner was Sukumar Sen

Types of elections
Elections in the Republic of India include elections for:
President of India,
Vice President of India,
Members of the Parliament in Rajya Sabha (Upper house) and Lok Sabha (Lower house), 
Members of State Legislative Councils,
Members of State Legislative Assemblies (includes legislative assemblies of three union territories - Jammu and Kashmir, National Capital Territory of Delhi and Puducherry)
Members of local governance bodies (Municipal bodies and Panchayats),
By-election is held when a seat-holder of a particular constituent dies, resigns, or is disqualified.

Parliamentary general elections (Lok Sabha)
Members of Lok Sabha (House of the People) or the lower house of India's Parliament are elected by being voted upon by all adult citizens of India, from a set of candidates who stand in their respective constituencies. Every adult citizen of India can vote only in their constituency. Candidates who win the Lok Sabha elections are called 'Member of Parliament' and hold their seats for five years or until the body is dissolved by the President on the advice of the council of ministers. The house meets in the Lok Sabha Chambers of the Sansad Bhavan in New Delhi, on matters relating to the creation of new laws, removing or improving the existing laws that affect all citizens of India. Elections take place once in 5 years to elect 543 members for the Lok Sabha (Lower house).
{|class="wikitable"
|-

|+ style="text-align: left;" | General election results (Lok Sabha)
|
|
|
|
|
|
|
|
|
|
|
|
|
|
|
|
|

History of Lok Sabha elections

State Assembly (Vidhan Sabha) Elections 
Members of State Legislative Assembly, are elected directly by voting, from a set of candidates who stands in their respective constituencies. Every adult citizen of India can vote only in their constituency. Candidates who win the State Legislative Assemblies elections are called 'Member of Legislative Assembly' (MLA) and hold their seats for five years or until the body is dissolved by the Governor. The house meets in the respective state, on matters relating to the creation of new laws, removing or improving the existing laws that affect all citizens living in that state.

The total strength of each assembly depends on each State, mostly based on size and population. Similar to the Lok Sabha elections, the leader of the majority party/alliance takes oath as Chief Minister of the State.

The Election Commission conducts the elections and provides voluntary facility to 80 years plus aged electors to vote through ballot papers at their homes depending upon polling booth accessibility. Elections are taken up enthusiastically by major portion of the population who turn out in high numbers.
For example, An 83-year-old woman, Dolma, cast her vote at Chasak Bhatori polling station in Pangi area of Chamba district after covering 14 kilometers walking on a snowy road during 2022 assembly elections in Himachal Pradesh.

By-election 
hen an elected candidate to either the State Assembly or Lok Sabha or Rajya Sabha leaves the office vacant before their term ends, a by-election is conducted to find a suitable replacement to fill the vacant position. It is often referred to in India as Bypolls.

Common reasons for by-elections:
 Resignation by the sitting MP or MLA
 Death of the sitting MP or MLA

But other reasons occur when the incumbent becomes ineligible to continue in office (criminal conviction, failure to maintain a minimum level of attendance in the office, due to election irregularities found later, or when a candidate wins more than one seat and has to vacate one).

Rajya Sabha (Upper House) Elections 

The Rajya Sabha, also known as the Council of States, is the upper house of India's Parliament. Candidates are not elected directly by the citizens, but by the Members of Legislative  Assemblies and up to 12  can be nominated by the President of India for their contributions to art, literature, science, and social services. Members of the Parliament in Rajya Sabha get a tenure of six years, with one-third of the body facing re-election every two years. Rajya Sabha acts as a second-level review body before a bill becomes an act.

The Vice President of India is the ex-officio Chairman of the Rajya Sabha, who presides over its sessions.

The Legislative proposals (making new laws, removing or appending new conditions to the existing law) are brought before either house of the Parliament in the form of a bill. A bill is the draft of a legislative proposal, which, when passed by both houses of Parliament (Lok Sabha and Rajya Sabha) and assented to by the President, becomes an Act of Parliament.

The Constitution of India, however, places some restrictions on the Rajya Sabha which makes the Lok Sabha more powerful in certain areas. For example, it stipulates that Money bills must originate in the Lok Sabha. 
 
Members of Rajya Sabha debate bills sent by the Lok Sabha and can approve, reject or send the bill back to the Lok Sabha for further debate and discussion on the matter, as well as to suggest better changes in the drafted bill. Members of Rthe ajya Sabha can only make recommendations to the Lok Sabha for money bills within 14 days. Even if Rajya Sabha fails to return the money bill in 14 days to the Lok Sabha, that bill is deemed to have passed by both the Houses. Also, if the Lok Sabha rejects any (or all) of the amendments proposed by the Rajya Sabha, the bill is deemed to have been passed by both Houses of Parliament of India in the form oin whichthe Lok Sabha finally passes it.

Electoral procedures
Candidates are required to file their nomination papers with the Electoral Commission. Then, a list of candidates is published. No party is allowed to use government resources for campaigning. No party is allowed to bribe the candidates before elections. The government cannot start a project during the election period. Campaigning ends by 6:00 pm two days before the polling day.

The polling is held between 7:00 am and 6:00 pm. The Collector of each district is in charge of polling. Government employees are employed as poll officers at the polling stations. Electronic Voting Machines (EVM) are being used instead of ballot boxes to prevent election fraud. After the citizen votes, his or her left index finger is marked with indelible ink. This practice was instituted in 1962.

Indelible ink

Research into indelible ink was commenced by the Council of Scientific and Industrial Research (CSIR). In the 1950s, M. L. Goel worked on this research at the Chemical Division of the National Physical Laboratory of India. The ink used contains silver nitrate, which makes it photo-sensitive. It is stored in amber-colored plastic or brown-colored glass bottles. On application, the ink remains on the fingernail for at least two days. It may last up to a month, depending on the person's body temperature and the environment.

Electronic voting

BHAVIK (EVM) were first used in the 1997 election and became the only method of voting in 2004. The EVMs save time in reporting results. A voter-verified paper audit trail (VVPAT) was introduced on 14 August 2014 in Nagaland. In the 2014 general election, VVPAT was operational in 8 constituencies (Lucknow, Gandhinagar, Bangalore South, Chennai Central, Jadavpur, Raipur, Patna Sahib and Mizoram) as a pilot project. A slip generated by the VVPAT tells a voter to which party or candidate their vote has been given, their name, their constituency and their polling booth.

Opposition parties demanded that VVPAT be made mandatory all over India due to allegations against the government of hacking the EVM. Accordingly, Voter-verified paper audit trail (VVPAT) and EVMs were used in every assembly and the general election in India since 2019. On 9 April 2019, Supreme Court of India gave the judgement, ordering the Election Commission of India to increase the  VVPAT slips vote count to five randomly selected EVMs per assembly constituency, which means the Election Commission of India has to count VVPAT slips of 20,625 EVMs in the  2019 General elections. VVPAT enables voters to cross-check whether the vote they have given goes to their desired candidate as the VVPAT unit produces a paper slip, additionally called a  ballot slip, that contains the name, serial number, and image of the candidate selected by the voter for his vote. Post the 2019 general election, ECI declared that no mismatches between EVM and VVPAT.

NOTA

On 27 September 2013, the Supreme Court of India judged that citizens have the right to cast a negative vote by exercising the "None of the above" (NOTA) option. This was the result of petitioning by the Electoral Commission and the People's Union for Civil Liberties in 2009. In November 2013, NOTA was introduced in five state elections. If the majority votes are for NOTA, the region comes under presidential jurisdiction and is treated with laws similar to a national territory.

Absentee voting
India does not provide general absentee voting. On 24 November 2010, the Representation of the People (Amendment) Bill 2010 was gazetted to give voting rights to non-resident Indians but a physical presence at the voting booth is still required.

Postal voting
Postal voting in India is done only through the "Electronically Transmitted Postal Ballot Papers (ETPB)" system of Election Commission of India, where ballot papers are distributed to the registered eligible voters and they return the votes by post. When the counting of votes commences, these postal votes are counted before those from the Electronic Voting Machines. Only certain categories of people are eligible to register as postal voters. People working in the Union armed forces and state police as well as their spouses, and employees working for the Government of India who are officially posted abroad can register for the postal vote, these are also called the "Service voters". Additionally, people in preventive detention, disabled and those above the age of 80 years old can use postal vote. Prisoners can not vote at all.

See also

 49-O  Now replaced with 'NOTA (None of The Above)'
 Booth capturing
 History of democracy in the Indian-subcontinent
 Election Commission of India
 Exercise Franchise For Good Governance
 Legislative Assembly elections in India
 British India - General Elections
 1920 Indian general election
 1923 Indian general election
 1926 Indian general election
 1930 Indian general election
 1934 Indian general election
 1945 Indian general election
 British India - Provincial Elections
 1937 Indian provincial elections
 1946 Indian provincial elections

References

External links

 Election Commission of India
 Adam Carr's election archive
 Qualification and disqualification Election Commission of India handbook for candidates
 Elections India